was a town located in Ogasa District, Shizuoka Prefecture, Japan.

At the time of its merger, the town has an estimated population of 15,968 and a density of 526 persons per km². The total area is 30.36 km². The main agricultural products of the area include green tea, aloe and blueberries. The nearest train station was Kikugawa Station on the Tōkaidō Main Line.

On January 17, 2005, Ogasa, along with the former town of Kikugawa (also from Ogasa District), was merged to create the city of Kikugawa and thus no longer exists as an independent municipality.

External links
 Yaizu official website 

Dissolved municipalities of Shizuoka Prefecture
Kikugawa, Shizuoka